Luno the White Stallion was a Terrytoons television series that aired in the mid-1960s. It centered on a little boy named Tim who had a toy horse Pegasus of marble white named Luno who would come alive and whisk him off on adventures in far off lands when Tim said the words, "Oh winged horse of marble white, take me on a magic flight". The series was produced by William Weiss, and directed by Connie Rasinski and Arthur Bartsch.

Cast
Luno the White Stallion - Bob McFadden
Tim - Norma MacMillan and Dayton Allen

Episodes

 The Missing Genie (1963)
 Trouble in Baghdad (1963)
 King Rounder (1963)
 Jungle Jack (1963)
 Melvin the Magnificent (1963)
 Mixed Up Matador (1963)
 The Flying Chariot (1963)
 The Poor Pirate (1963)
 The Prehysteric Inventor (1963)
 The Square Planet (1963)
 Who's Dragon (1963)
 Island of the Giants (1963)
 Roc-a-Bye Sinbad (1964)
 The Gold Dust Bandit (1964)
 Adventure by the Sea (1964)
 King Neptune's Castle (1965)
 The Astronut Show (1965)

References

External links
The Big Cartoon Database
Luno the White Stallion at Don Markstein's Toonopedia. Archived from the original on November 16, 2015.

1960s American animated television series
1963 American television series debuts
1965 American television series endings
American children's animated adventure television series
Animated television series about children
Animated television series about horses
Television series by CBS Studios
Television series by Terrytoons